Wat Chan is a subdistrict in the Mueang Phitsanulok District of Phitsanulok Province, Thailand. In 2019 it had a population of 8,819 and 4,490 households. In this subdistrict was the first cooperative in Thailand registered.

Geography
The topography of Wat Chan is fertile lowlands with an area of 11.26 km2 of which a section immediately northwest of the Nan river and a section southeast of this river, but separated by an area annexed by the city of Phitsanulok, with a forest and a pond (Thung Nong Phad) rich in marine life (Moo4). The subdistrict is bordered to the north by Phlai Chumphon subdistrict and Ban Khlong subdistrict, to the east by the city of Phitsanulok, to the south by Bueng Phra subdistrict and Tha Pho subdistrict. Wat Chan subdistrict lies in the Nan Basin, which is part of the Chao Phraya Watershed.

History
ฺWat Chan Subdistrict Administrative Organization - SAO (ongkan borihan suan tambon) was established, published 30 January 1996 in Royal Thai Government Gazette, volume 113, section 9d. On 9 March 1999 Wat Chan subdistrict lost the communities Phan Phee, Phraya Suphan, Wat Chan Tawan Ook, Barom Trilokanat 21, Wat Chan Tawan Tok and Chaiyanuphap to the growing city of Phitsanulok. The new borders are located 200 meter south of the Barom Trilokanat road (landmarks 15-16) and west of the Chaiyanuphap road (landmarks 18-19).

Administration
The administration of Wat Chan SAO is responsible for an area that covers 11.26 km2 and consists of six administrative villages, as of 2019: 8,819 people and 4,489 households.

Administrative villages contain many villages such as:
 Moo2 - Charoen Suk
 Moo4 - Kitsasiri
 Moo8 - Panasiri
 Moo10- Wana Lake Home, Wana Town Home

Logo
The Wat Chan SAO (อบต - oh boh toh) logo shows the office of the first cooperative in Thailand.

Temples

Wat Chan subdistrict is home to the following active temple, where Theravada Buddhism is practiced by local residents: Wat Ratchamonthop (Thai: วัดราชมณทป) colloquially referred to as Wat Luang Pho To (Thai: วัดหลงพ่อโต) or Wat Takrai (Thai: วัดตะไกร) is a Buddhist temple in Ban Don (Moo7). During the Second World War, the temple was bombed by the Axis powers due to its proximity to a military camp and became a ruin. Even the main Buddha Image of the temple was destroyed. The temple has been abandoned and later restored, while it became a royal temple with the name Wat Ratchamonthop.
Originally there were three more Buddhist temples in this subdistrict:
 Wat Pan Phi (Thai: วัดพันปี)
 Wat Chan Tawan Ook (Thai: วัดจันทร์ตะวันออก)
 Wat Chan Tawan Tok (Thai: วัดจันทร์ตะวันตก)
But due to the annexation of villages by the city of Phitsanulok in 1999, these three temples are no longer in Wat Chan subdistrict.

Infrastructure

Education
 Community learning center
 Kindergarten

Healthcare
There is Wat Chan health-promoting hospital in Ban Bo (Moo7).Further every administrative village has its own community primary health center ( 6 locations).

Transportation
Major road is:
 Highway 117, Phitsanulok-Nakhon Sawan route.

Electricity
Almost every households in Wat Chan subdistrict have access to the electricity network of Provincial Electricity Authority (PEA).

Communications
All households have access to the fixed and mobile telephone network.

Waterworks
All households of Wat Chan have access to the water network of Provincial Waterworks Authority (PWA).

Economy
Of the population 30% are engaged in agriculture, of which rice is the main product.
Retail, hotels, restaurants and factories are mainly located along highway 117. The following companies play a role in the employment service: Global House, Major Furniture Mall (MFM) and Schlumberger - Phitsanulok - Base., .

First cooperative in Thailand
Krom Muen Pitaya Longkorn (1876-1945) was the "Father of Thai Cooperatives". On 26 February 1916 he was the first cooperative registrar with "Wat Chan Cooperative Unlimited". The start was with 16 members and a working capital of 3,080 baht. As of 2018 the cooperative had 6,691 members in 59 groups.

References

Tambon of Phitsanulok province
Populated places in Phitsanulok province